The Charge of the Headlight Brigade was a 13-hour endurance race for sports cars and sedans hosted by the North Carolina Region of the Sports Car Club of America (SCCA). The event was held at Virginia International Raceway in Danville, Virginia beginning in 2003. The name is a reference to the Charge of the Light Brigade, an 1854 battle memorialized in a famous poem by Alfred Tennyson.

References 

Auto races in the United States
Sports Car Club of America
Motorsport in Virginia
2003 establishments in Virginia
Recurring sporting events established in 2003
Danville, Virginia